Kyrylo Kostenko (born 4 December 1998) is a Ukrainian professional footballer who plays as a midfielder.

Career
Kostenko is a product of the Sportive School #1 Khmelnytskyi and Metalurh Donetsk youth team systems.

After dissolution of Metalurh Donetsk in 2015, he was signed by FC Stal Kamianske and made his debut for main-squad FC Stal in the winning game against FC Zorya Luhansk on 16 July 2017 in the Ukrainian Premier League.

In summer 2022 he moved to Epitsentr Dunaivtsi. In February 2023 his contract with the club expired.

References

External links
 

1998 births
Living people
Sportspeople from Khmelnytskyi, Ukraine
Ukrainian footballers
Ukrainian Premier League players
Ukrainian First League players
Ukrainian Second League players
FC Stal Kamianske players
FC Podillya Khmelnytskyi players
Association football midfielders
FC Oleksandriya players